Auspicious dreams are often described in texts of Jainism which forecast the virtue of children. Their number varies according to different traditions and they described frequently as fourteen or sixteen dreams. They are seen by mothers of the prominent figures in Jainism including Tirthankaras, on the conception of their soul in the womb. They are interpreted as describing virtues and kingship of a future child. They are also found in various artistic media as an ornamentation.

Dreams 
Their number and description differ according to major traditions of Jainism. According to Digambara tradition, there are 16 dreams while according to Svetambara tradition, there are 14 dreams. Most of them are same. They are described in detail as dreams of queen Trishala, mother of Mahavira, in some Jain texts.

These dreams features animals, objects and a goddess associated with positive virtues and kingship. They are generally considered positive symbols in Indian culture so they frequently appear in other Indian religions like Buddhism and Hinduism.

Importance

In texts 
These dreams are connected with the births of Tirthankaras and the other prominent people including Chakravarti, Balabhadra/Baladeva and Vāsudeva in Jainism. They are 63 in total and called Shalakapurusha. Their mothers see a certain number of dreams on conception of their soul in womb. They are described in the great detail in Kalpasutra. 12th century Jain monk Hemchandracharya described and interpreted them in detail in Trishashthishalakapurush. Avashyak-niryukti, an early verse-commentary in Prakrit, explains relation of names of some Tirthankaras and these dreams.

Festivals 
On the fifth day of festival of Paryusana, Jain monks read or narrate the portion of the Kalpasutra dealing with birth of last Tirthankara Mahavira, to the Jain lay people. They are displayed to the people in the form of silver models and auctioned for temporary possession and display to other people for festive days.

Other 

These dreams are symbolised and found in artistic media like paintings in manuscripts and on its covers, books, ornamentation in stone carvings, invitation scrolls and temple furnitures.

References

Sources

External links 

 The Dreams of Queen Trishala
 Dreams of mother of Tirthankara
 Dreams in Jainism -Jainpedia
 Description on Sacred-Texts

Jain belief and doctrine
Dreams in religion